This is a list of commercial banks in the Democratic Republic of the Congo, as of 31 March 2020.

Banks 
 Equity Banque Commerciale du Congo (Equity BCDC): Majority owned by Equity Group Holdings Limited
 International Bank for Africa in Congo ( French: "Banque Internationale pour l'Afrique au Congo") (BIAC)
 FBN Bank DRC SA, a subsidiary of First Bank of Nigeria.
 Citibank, since 1971
 Standard Bank Congo
 Rawbank
 Ecobank RDC
 Trust Merchant Bank
 Afriland First Bank
 Access Bank DRC
 Solidaire Banque SA
 SofiBanque
 Advans Banque Congo
 Bank of Africa RDC
 United Bank for Africa Congo DRC
 BGFIBank DRC

Defunct banks
 African Trade Bank (ATB)
 Bank with Gold Confidence (Bancor)
 Congolese Bank of Commerce Outside (BCCE)
 Continental Bank of Congo (BanCoC)
 Trade and Development Bank (BCD)
 Bank of Crédit Agricole (BCA)
 Compagnie Banciare de Commerce et de Credit (COBAC)
 First Bank Congo Corporation (FBCC)
 New Bank of Kinshasa (NBK)
 Ryad Bank (RB)
 Union of Congolese Banks (UBC)
 Continental Bank in Zaire (BACAZ)
 Congolese Bank (BC)
 Mining Bank of Congo
 La Cruche Banque

See also
 Central Bank of the Congo
 List of banks in Africa
 List of companies based in the Democratic Republic of the Congo

References

External links
 Website of the Central Bank of the Congo (French)

Banks
Congo, Democratic Republic of the
 
Congo, Democratic Republic of the